Aquaculture in Vanuatu exists on a small scale, both commercially and privately. Several aquacultural efforts have been made in the country, including attempts to raise Pacific oyster, rabbitfish, Malaysian prawn, and tilapia. Experiments with Kappaphycus alvarezii and three species of giant clam were carried out by the Fisheries Department in 1999. The official Fisheries Department records state that $1165 US of cultured coral was exported from the country in 2000, with 275 pieces in total. The cultivation of Macrobrachium lar in taro terraces is practiced for subsistence purposes, and Macrobrachium rosenbergii has been identified by the Vanuatu government as a high-priority species.

There is little commercial or private-sector aquaculture in Vanuatu. The Fisheries Department operates a small hatchery for trochus shell (Trochus niloticus), producing juveniles which are used in experiments to study the impact and potential of reef re-seeding as a means of enhancement the wild trochus fishery. Similar experimental work on green snail (Turbo marmoratus) is also carried out. 

In mid-1999 the Fisheries Department carried out some spawning trials of three specieis of giant clams. In the same year the Department brought seaweed (Kappaphycus alvarezi) from Fiji for some experimental culture. On September 1, 2008, Vanuatu became the first Pacific Island country to have an aquaculture development plan and an Aquaculture and Fisheries Association.

See also 
 Fishing in Vanuatu

References

Vanuatu
Economy of Vanuatu
Water in Vanuatu